The Southern Districts women's cricket team was the women's representative cricket team for southern New Zealand, primarily the regions of Otago and Canterbury. From 1983–84 to 1987–88 they competed in the Hansells Cup, and were eventually replaced in the competition by a returning Otago team in 1998–99.

History
Southern Districts played their first match in 1969, against a touring England side, with the match ending in a draw.

Southern Districts did not play another match until the 1983–84 season, when they joined the Hansells Cup, which at the time was a 2-day competition. The team was made up of players from Otago, who stopped competing after the 1982–83 season, and players who missed out on the Canterbury side. They finished bottom of the group in their first season, failing to win a match. They won their first match the following season, 1984–85, beating Auckland, and achieved their best finish, ending the season in 4th place. Their victory over Auckland was the only win they would ever achieve, however, and they finished bottom of the league in the subsequent three season. After this, ahead of the 1988–99 season, the tournament reverted to 5 teams competing, and Southern Districts were disbanded. Otago rejoined the league in 1998–99.

Players

Notable players
Players who played for Southern Districts and played internationally are listed below, in order of first international appearance (given in brackets):

 Jenny Olson (1969)
 Carol Marett (1972)
 Barbara Bevege (1973)
 Sue Rattray (1973)
 Sheree Harris (1978)
 Jan Hall (1982)
 Kirsty Bond (1988)
 Sarah Illingworth (1988)
 Jennifer Turner (1988)
 Debbie Ford (1988)
 Maia Lewis (1992)
 Justine Russell (1995)
 Delwyn Brownlee (1995)
 Karen Le Comber (1996)

Honours
 Hallyburton Johnstone Shield:
 Winners (0):  
 Best Finish: 4th (1984–85)

See also
 Canterbury Magicians
 Otago Sparks

References

Women's cricket teams in New Zealand
Cricket in Canterbury
Cricket in Otago